The Bogotá Savannah Railway was a company that provided transport for passengers from 1889 between the cities of the Metropolitan Area of Bogotá. The Savannah railway was liquidated in 1991 along with the National Railways of Colombia.

Currently, and from 1992, one of its lines (Northern line) was enabled to function as tourist train called Tren Turistico de la Sabana.

History
The construction of the Savannah Railway was authorized in 1873 and begun in 1882 by a British company. The works were suspended in 1886 when its length was just 18 km. A new contract was made with an American venture called “Savannah Railway Company”. When the line was inaugurated its length was 40 km. In 1887 a new contract took place for the construction of the Zipaquira line. In time, the railways expanded across the Bogotá Savannah reaching a length of about 200 km.

In 1917 the Estacion de la Sabana was built by the English engineer William Lidstone; this building served as Central Station for the national railway as well. Its location was on the outskirts of the city on the west (today Calle 13).

The last expansion of the Bogotá Savannah Railway occurred in 1953. By that time the Railway's service covered the following towns: Chapinero, Usaquen, Sopo, Tocancipa, Nemocon, Suesca, Gachancipa, Cajica, Fontibon, Madrid, Mosquera, Facatativa, Bosa, Soacha, Sibate and Usme.

The Bogotá Savannah Railway in 1953

Stations of Ferrocarril del Occidente (Western line):
(Opened en 1889)
Bogotá La Sabana (Main station of Bogotá)
Bogotá Puente Aranda
Bogotá Fontibón
Mosquera
Madrid
Facatativá

Stations of Ferrocarril del Sur (Southern line):
Bosa
Soacha
Alicachín, opened in 1916
Sibaté (Estación Santa Isabel), opened en 1926
San Miguel, opened en 1930

Stations of Ferrocarril del Norte (Northern line):

Puente del Común (Estación M. A. Caro, known as "La Caro") opened in 1894
Cajicá,  opened in 1896
Zipaquirá, opened in 1898
Nemocón, opened in 1907

Stations of Ferrocarril del Nordeste (North Eastern line):

Chapinero
Calle 100
Usaquén
Puente del Común (Estación M. A. Caro)
Briceño (Sopó)
Tocancipá
Gachancipá
Suesca

Stations of Ferrocarril del Oriente (Eastern Line):
 La Requilina (Usme)

See also
Metro of Bogotá
Tramways of Bogotá
RegioTram

Rail transport in Colombia
Metropolitan Area of Bogotá
Public transport in Colombia
Transport in Bogotá
3 ft gauge railways in Colombia